Oksana Aleksandrovna Rogova (born 7 October 1978 in Tambov) is a Russian triple jumper. She represented Russia at the 2000 Summer Olympics, finishing eighth in the women's triple jump competition.

She won the silver medal at the 1999 European Athletics Under 23 Championships and she was the 2003 Summer Universiade champion in the triple jump. Her other significant medal in her career is a gold at the 2006 European Athletics Indoor Cup. She took part in the 1999 World Championships in Athletics, finishing in ninth position.

Her personal best jump is 14.59 metres, achieved in August 1999 in Gothenburg. However, she achieved 14.70 m indoors at a meeting in Volgograd in 2002.

Achievements

References

External links

sports-reference

1978 births
Living people
Russian female triple jumpers
Athletes (track and field) at the 2000 Summer Olympics
Olympic athletes of Russia
Universiade medalists in athletics (track and field)
Universiade gold medalists for Russia
Medalists at the 2003 Summer Universiade